Elachista ceratiola is a moth of the family Elachistidae. It is found on the Fleurieu Peninsula in South Australia.

The wingspan is 12.2 mm for males. The forewings are blue and the hindwings are grey.

References

Moths described in 2011
ceratiola
Moths of Australia
Taxa named by Lauri Kaila